Fozia Ayub Qureshi (born 16 August 1963) is a Pakistani politician who was a member of the Provincial Assembly of the Punjab, from May 2013 to May 2018.

Early life and education
She was born on 16 August 1963 in Bahawalpur.

She has completed intermediate level education.
FAMILY: HASEEB QURESHI (SON)

Political career

She was elected to the Provincial Assembly of the Punjab as a candidate of Pakistan Muslim League (N) on a reserved seat for women in 2013 Pakistani general election.

References

Living people
Women members of the Provincial Assembly of the Punjab
Punjab MPAs 2013–2018
1963 births
Pakistan Muslim League (N) politicians
21st-century Pakistani women politicians